The Old Bridge Township Public Schools are a comprehensive community public school district that serves students in kindergarten through twelfth grade from Old Bridge Township, in Middlesex County, New Jersey, United States.

As of the 2016-17 school year, the district's 15 schools had an enrollment of 8,899 students and 708.00 classroom teachers (on an FTE basis), for a student–teacher ratio of 12.6:1.

The district is classified by the New Jersey Department of Education as being in District Factor Group "FG", the fourth-highest of eight groupings. District Factor Groups organize districts statewide to allow comparison by common socioeconomic characteristics of the local districts. From lowest socioeconomic status to highest, the categories are A, B, CD, DE, FG, GH, I and J.

History
Old Bridge High School opened in September 1994. It was formed from the merger of Cedar Ridge High School and Madison Central High School, which were the two existing high schools in Old Bridge Township.

Awards and recognition
Cheesequake Elementary School was one of nine public schools recognized in 2017 as Blue Ribbon Schools by the United States Department of Education.

Schools
Schools in the district (with 2016-17 enrollment data from the National Center for Education Statistics) are:
Elementary schools (K-5)
M. Scott Carpenter Elementary School (274 students)
Leroy Gordon Cooper Elementary School (243)
Virgil I. Grissom Elementary School (230)
Madison Park Elementary School (261)
James A. McDivitt Elementary School (449)
Memorial Elementary School (405)
William A. Miller Elementary School (330)
Walter M. Schirra Elementary School (323)
Alan B. Shepard Elementary School (249)
Southwood Elementary School (433)
Raymond E. Voorhees Elementary School (346)
Middle schools (6-8)
Jonas Salk Middle School (984)
Carl Sandburg Middle School (1,143)
High school
Old Bridge High School for grades 9-12 (2,865)

Former schools
Cheesequake Elementary School (287)
It was the oldest building in the district. The district felt that the building did not have sufficient parking. In 2019 it had 280 students and 25 students.
In January 2019, after the State of New Jersey reduced funding, David Cittadino, the superintendent, announced it would likely close the school. The district was to have $12,000,000 fewer dollars in its budget for a five year period, and the district leadership publicly stated that the state caused Cheesequake to close. The Cheesequake closure would mean the district would spend $750,000 fewer. It closed in 2019. Schools that took former Cheesequake students were Madison Park, McDivitt, Memorial and Shepard. In 2020 Sayreville Public Schools planned to rent the facilities temporarily after the closure.

Administration
Core members of the district's administration are:
David Cittadino, Superintendent
Joseph J. Marra, Business Administrator / Board Secretary

References

External links

Old Bridge Township Public Schools

School Data for the Old Bridge Township Public Schools, National Center for Education Statistics

Old Bridge Township, New Jersey
New Jersey District Factor Group FG
School districts in Middlesex County, New Jersey